Neutral and Non-Aligned European States, sometimes known by abbreviation NN states, was a Cold War era informal grouping of states in Europe which were neither part of NATO nor Warsaw Pact but were either neutral or members of the Non-Aligned Movement. The group brought together neutral countries of Austria, Finland, Sweden, and Switzerland on one, and non-aligned SFR Yugoslavia, Cyprus and Malta on the other hand all of which together shared interest in preservation of their independent non-bloc position with regard to NATO, European Community, Warsaw Pact and the Council for Mutual Economic Assistance. Established and comparatively highly developed European neutral countries perceived cooperation with non-aligned countries (particularly with SFR Yugoslavia as one of the leaders of the group) as a way to advocate for peace, disarmament and superpowers' restraint more forcefully than their limited earlier cooperation would permit.

The group cooperated within the Conference on Security and Co-operation in Europe (CSCE) in trying to preserve the results of the Helsinki Accords. In this framework, Yugoslavia cooperated with Austria and Finland on mediation between blocs, organized a second CSCE summit in 1977 in Belgrade and proposed drafts on national minorities protection which are still valid and integral parts of OSCE provisions on minority rights.

See also 
 Neutral member states in the EU
 Swedish neutrality
 Irish neutrality
 Swiss neutrality
 Declaration of Neutrality
 Yugoslavia and the Non-Aligned Movement
 Cyprus and the Non-Aligned Movement
 Malta and the Non-Aligned Movement
 1995 enlargement of the European Union
 2004 enlargement of the European Union

References

Further reading 
 
 
 

Non-interventionism
Foreign relations of Europe
Political history of Austria
Political history of Cyprus
Political history of Finland
Political history of Malta
Political history of Sweden
Political history of Switzerland
Foreign relations of Yugoslavia